The 2007–08 Tahiti Ligue 2 was the second highest division of the Tahitian football league. The competition is organized and administered by  Fédération Tahitienne de Football.

Participating teams

In 2007–08 edition of the competition, 12 teams participated.

AS Vaiete, AS Excelsior, AS Punaruu, AS Vénus, AS Papenoo, AS Vairao, AS Roniu, AS Olympic Mahina, AS Papara, AS Vaiarii Nui, AS Vaiotaha and AS Hitia'a.

Final classification
Table:

 1.AS Vaiete           22  17  3  2  72-21  59  Promoted
 2.AS Excelsior        22  15  4  3  76-23  56  Promoted

 3.AS Punaruu          22  12  6  4  58-21  52
 4.AS Vénus            22  11  7  4  61-24  51
 5.AS Papenoo          22  12  4  6  49-35  50
 6.AS Vairao           22  10  5  7  42-21  47
 7.AS Roniu            22   9  4  9  44-31  44
 8.AS Olympic Mahina   22   8  4 10  52-40  42
 9.AS Papara           21   6  4 11  45-52  35  [-2]
 10.AS Vaiarii Nui      22   3  4 15  27-65  31  [-1]

 11.AS Vaiotaha         22   2  3 17  26-96  29  Relegated
 12.AS Hitia'a          21   2  0 19  26-149 25  Relegated

NB: points system changed from 4-2-1 to 3-2-1

Matches

Round 1
 [Sep 16]

Vaiarii Nui       0-4 Vairao

Roniu             3-1 Excelsior

Papenoo           1-4 Punaruu

Ol. Mahina        0-3 Vénus

Vaiete            3-1 Hitia'a

Vaiotaha          1-4 Papara

Round 2 
[Sep 22,23]

Excelsior         3-0 Vairao

Vénus             2-2 Punaruu

Hitia'a           1-6 Ol. Mahina

Papenoo           3-0 Roniu

Vaiarii Nui       awd Papara
            [awarded 0-3, originally 3-2]
[date?]
Vaiotaha          0-5 Vaiete

Round 3
[Oct 5]

Punaruu           1-0 Excelsior

[Oct 7]

Vaiete            2-2 Vénus

Ol. Mahina        1-2 Papenoo

Roniu             2-2 Vaiarii Nui

Papara            0-2 Vairoa

Hitia'a           3-2 Vaiotaha

Round 4 
[Oct 12]

Vénus            12-0 Hitia'a

Excelsior         3-1 Ol. Mahina
  
[Oct 14]
 
Papara            2-1 Roniu

Vaiarii Nui       0-4 Punaruu
      
Papenoo           1-2 Vaiete

[date?]

Vaiotaha          1-4 Vairao

Round 5

[Oct 26]

Vénus             2-1 Vaiotaha

Punaruu           2-2 Papara

[Oct 28]

Hitia'a           1-2 Papenoo

Vaiete            4-1 Excelsior

Ol. Mahina        0-0 Vaiarii Nui

Roniu             0-0 Vairao

Round 6

[Nov 2]

Punaruu           1-0 Vairoa

Excelsior         6-1 Hitia'a

[Nov 4]

Papara            3-3 Ol. Mahina

Vaiarii Nui       2-4 Vaiete

Papenoo           3-3 Vénus

Vaiotaha          0-0 Roniu

Round 7

[Nov 16]

Vénus             0-2 Excelsior

Punaruu           0-2 Roniu

[Nov 18]

Hitia'a           4-3 Vaiarii Nui

Vaiete            4-0 Papara

Ol. Mahina        2-1 Vairao

Papenoo           3-3 Vaiotaha

Round 8
 [Nov 25]

Papara            1-4 Excelsior

Papenoo           3-2 Vairao

Roniu             2-1 Vénus

Hitia'a           1-4 Punaruu

Ol. Mahina        0-1 Vaiete

Vaiotaha          1-2 Vaiarii Nui

Round 9
 
[Dec 7]

Excelsior         2-2 Papenoo

Punaruu           6-1 Vaiotaha

[Dec 9]

Vaiete            1-1 Vairao

Ol. Mahina        2-1 Roniu

[Jan 25]

Vénus             4-1 Vaiarii Nui

[Jun 1]

Hitia'a            -  Papara

Round 10

[Dec 14]

Vénus             3-1 Papara

Excelsior         7-1 Vaiotaha

[Dec 16]

Papenoo           6-0 Vaiarii Nui

Hitia'a           1-5 Vairao

Roniu             0-1 Vaiete

Ol. Mahina        2-2 Punaruu

Round 11

[Jan 11]

Vénus             1-1 Vairao

[Jan 13]

Papara            3-5 Papenoo

Vaiarii Nui       1-2 Excelsior

Vaiotaha          0-5 Ol. Mahina

Vaiete            2-0 Punaruu

Hitia'a          1-14 Roniu

Round 12

[Jan 18]

Excelsior         1-0 Roniu

Punaruu           3-1 Papenoo

Vénus             3-1 Ol. Mahina

[Jan 20]

Hitia'a           2-8 Vaiete

Papara            awd Vaiotaha          [awarded 0-3, originally 5-1]

Vairao            2-2 Vaiarii Nui       [award of 0-3 revoked]

Round 13

[Feb 1]

Vénus             0-0 Punaruu

[Feb 3]

Roniu             1-2 Papenoo

Vairao            0-2 Excelsior

Papara            awd Vaiarii Nui       [awarded 0-3, originally 3-2]

Vaiete           12-0 Vaiotaha

Ol. Mahina        7-1 Hitia'a

Round 14
 [Feb 15-17]

Vénus             0-0 Vaiete

Excelsior         1-1 Punaruu

Vaiarii Nui       1-3 Roniu

Vairao            0-1 Papara

Vaiotaha          3-2 Hitia'a

Papenoo           2-1 Ol. Mahina

Round 15
 [Feb 22-24]

Punaruu           5-0 Vaiarii Nui
    
Ol. Mahina        1-1 Excelsior

Vaiete            4-1 Papenoo

Hitia'a           0-5 Vénus

Vairao            6-0 Vaiotaha

Roniu             1-2 Papara

Round 16 
[Feb 29]

Excelsior         1-0 Vaiete

[Mar 2]

Vaiarii Nui       1-7 Ol. Mahina

Papara            2-2 Punaruu

Vairao            0-0 Roniu

Vaiotaha         1-10 Vénus

Papenoo           6-0 Hitia'a

Round 17
[Mar 13]

Vairao            1-0 Punaruu
[Mar 14]
Vénus             0-1 Papenoo

[Mar 16]

Vaiete            5-1 Vaiarii Nui

Hitia'a          1-17 Excelsior

Roniu             1-0 Vaiotaha

Ol. Mahina        2-0 Papara

Round 18
 [Mar 27-30]

Excelsior         2-2 Vénus
   
Roniu             2-1 Punaruu
           
Vaiarii Nui       7-3 Hitia'a 
         
Papara            3-6 Vaiete
            
Vairao            3-1 Ol. Mahina
    
Vaiotaha          2-3 Papenoo

Round 19 [Apr 11-14]

Punaruu          10-0 Hitia'a

Excelsior         6-1 Papara

Vénus             5-0 Roniu

Vairao            1-0 Papenoo

Vaiete            3-2 Ol. Mahina 
  
Vaiarii Nui       1-1 Vaiotaha

Round 20 
[Apr 24]

Roniu             2-1 Ol. Mahina
[Apr 27]
Vaiotaha          0-4 Punaruu

Vairao            abd Vaiete            [abandoned at 0-0 in 2nd half]

[May 23]

Vairao            1-2 Vaiete            [replay]

[May 23?]

Vaiarii Nui       0-1 Vénus

[May 25]

Papenoo           0-1 Excelsior

Papara           15-1 Hitia'a

Round 21
 [May 9]

Punaruu           4-1 Ol. Mahina

Vaiotaha         2-10 Excelsior

Vaiarii Nui       0-1 Papenoo
 
Papara            1-2 Vénus

Vairao            5-0 Hitia'a 
	
Vaiete            3-0 Roniu

Round 22 
[May 14?]

Roniu             9-2 Hitia'a

[May 16]

Punaruu           2-0 Vaiete

Excelsior         3-0 Vaiarii Nui

Ol. Mahina        6-3 Vaiotaha

Vairao            3-0 Vénus

Papenoo           1-1 Papara

References

2
Sports leagues established in 2008